Núria Graham (born 25 June 1996 in Vic, Catalonia, Spain) is a Catalan singer and songwriter who sings primarily in English. She is of Irish and Catalan descent. Her first album, Bird Eyes (2015), layers her voice and electric guitar over electronic or acoustic backgrounds with sensual lyrics.

Discography
 First Tracks, Halley Records (2013)
 Bird Eyes, El Segell del Primavera (2015)
 In The Cave ep, El Segell del Primavera (2016)
 Does It Ring A Bell?, El Segell Del Primavera (2017)
 Marjorie, Primavera Labels (2020)
 Cyclamen, New Deal/Primavera (2023)

References

External links
 Núria Graham's official website
 Núria Graham's Facebook
 Núria Graham's Twitter
 Interview to Núria Graham

Living people
Singer-songwriters from Catalonia
1996 births
21st-century Spanish singers